County routes in Oneida County, New York, are generally signed with the Manual on Uniform Traffic Control Devices-standard yellow-on-blue pentagon route marker. County Route 840 (CR 840) was once the only signed county route within Oneida County. Additional markers went up in 2014.


Routes 1–50

Routes 51 and up

See also

County routes in New York

Notes

References

External links

Empire State Roads – Oneida County Roads